Aleksey Sergeyevich Naumov (born 2 February 1972) is a Russian former professional footballer, who played as defender. He played in Soviet First League, Russian Top Division and in Estonian Meistriliiga.

References

External links 
 Soccernet.ee profile 
 
 

1972 births
Living people
Soviet footballers
Soviet Union under-21 international footballers
Russian footballers
Association football defenders
Russia under-21 international footballers
Russian expatriate footballers
Expatriate footballers in Belarus
Expatriate footballers in Estonia
Russian expatriate sportspeople in Belarus
Russian expatriate sportspeople in Estonia
Russian Premier League players
FC Zenit Saint Petersburg players
FC Tyumen players
FC Rubin Kazan players
FC Torpedo Minsk players
FC Dynamo Brest players
JK Sillamäe Kalev players
FC Sheksna Cherepovets players